Wizards of Waverly Place is a television series.

Wizards of Waverly Place may also refer to:
Wizards of Waverly Place (soundtrack)
Wizards of Waverly Place (video game)
Wizards of Waverly Place: Spellbound
Wizards of Waverly Place: The Movie
List of Wizards of Waverly Place episodes
Wizards of Waverly Place (season 1)
Wizards of Waverly Place (season 2)
Wizards of Waverly Place (season 3)
Wizards of Waverly Place (season 4)